Andrea Brändli (born 5 June 1997) is a Swiss ice hockey player and member of the Swiss national team, currently playing with the Ohio State Buckeyes in the Western Collegiate Hockey Association (WCHA) of the NCAA Division I.

She represented Switzerland at the IIHF Women's World Championship in 2017, 2019, and 2021. Brändli was the third goaltender for Switzerland – behind starter Florence Schelling and backup Janine Alder – in the women's ice hockey tournament at the 2018 Winter Olympics.

Brändli is part of Team Switzerland at the 2022 Winter Olympics.

References

External links
 
 

1997 births
Living people
Swiss women's ice hockey goaltenders
People from Hinwil District
Ohio State Buckeyes women's ice hockey players
Olympic ice hockey players of Switzerland
Ice hockey players at the 2018 Winter Olympics
Ice hockey players at the 2022 Winter Olympics
Swiss expatriate ice hockey people
Swiss expatriate sportspeople in the United States
Sportspeople from the canton of Zürich